Erik Schultz-Eklund (born 14 August 1990 in Avesta) is a Swedish footballer currently playing for Avesta AIK.

Playing career

Gretna
He was scouted by Gretna in 2005 as a schoolboy at the age of 15. He signed YTS papers in August 2006 after a successful trial with the club. He made his first team debut for Gretna against Hibernian on 13 February 2008 in a 4–2 defeat at Easter Road.

Falkirk
He signed for Falkirk in summer 2008 following Gretna's relegation from the SPL.

Avesta
The defender left on 16 March 2010 the Scottish Premier League side Falkirk to sign for Avesta AIK.

Notes

External links

1990 births
Living people
Swedish footballers
Association football defenders
Gretna F.C. players
Falkirk F.C. players
Scottish Premier League players
Swedish expatriate footballers
Expatriate footballers in Scotland